Morteratsch refers to several locations in the Graubünden canton of Switzerland:

Morteratsch Glacier
Piz Morteratsch, a mountain (3751 m)
Val Morteratsch, a valley
Morteratsch railway station, a station of the Berninabahn, a railway line going from St. Moritz to Tirano